Emirati Iranians or Emirati Persians are residents of the United Arab Emirates of Iranian national background. The community accounts for 5-8% of the country's population.

Demographics
Due to the geographical proximity between Iran and the United Arab Emirates, Persians were the first major group of foreign settlers in the region, with a history dating back to the 1810s. Persians who resided in the Trucial States prior to 1925 or before the formation of the union were offered the Emirati citizenship as per Article 17 of the United Arab Emirates Citizenship and Passport Law of Year 1972. 

The UAE is currently home to 500,000 Iranian expatriates, most of whom live in Dubai. The Iranian Club in Dubai is the main social club of Iranian expatriates in the country.

The Iranian population in UAE also includes small communities of Baloch people and Khuzestani Arabs.

Business and organisations

There are an estimated 8,000 Iranian-backed businesses in Dubai. There is an Iranian Business Council - Dubai. There is also an Iranian Hospital in Dubai.

Iran maintains a consulate-general in Dubai.

The Iranian businesses in UAE own more than $ 300 billion there.

Religion

There are two notable Iranian mosques: the Iranian Mosque in Bur Dubai and the Iranian Mosque in Satwa. There is also a significant community of Baha'is.

See also

 Baloch people in the United Arab Emirates
 Iranian diaspora
 Iran–United Arab Emirates relations

References

Ethnic groups in the United Arab Emirates